Mount Atholl is a mountain in Antarctica, with a peak rising to  to the west of Mount Alexandra in the Denton Hills, Scott Coast. It was named by the New Zealand Geographic Board in 1994 after Sarah Atholl (died 1873), an early New Zealand botanist with an interest in lichens.

References
 

Mountains of Victoria Land
Scott Coast